The Marhal also prononounced Mandal, Marral or Mahal, are a Jat gotra, now found mainly in Punjab, although some are still found in Jarauda in Muzaffarnagar District of Uttar Pradesh. They are one of the larger Muley Jat clans.

History and origin
The Marhal are a predominantly Muslim Jat tribe with a small Hindu section originating in Samana and later also settling in Karnal, in what is now Haryana. It acquired the name Mahal from an ancestor who was found newly born by his dead mother's side. In the local dialect of Hindi and Urdu (Haryanwi), marhi designates a tomb or shrine.

According to tradition, they are descended from Yazdgerd III, the last Sassanian ruler of Iran. They migrated to Kabul, during the rule of Prithviraj Chauhan, under a Malik Salahauddin. On the recommendation of the nawab of Samana, the Malik received a grant of a 100 villages (referred to as mandal in the Hindi language), from Khanda Rao, a brother of Prithvi Raj. In the time of the Sultan Alauddin Khilji, the Mahal received the jagirs of Samana and Malkana. Although this tradition is problematic due to the existence of a small Hindu branch

Another origin theory of the tribe comes from Cecil Henry Buck, who posits that since in some traditions Mandals called themselves " Mandal-i-Nausherwani," they may have been descendants of Nausherwani chiefs have held sway at Kharan in Baluchistan who could have accompanied Nadir Shah for the invasion of Delhi in 1738 A.D. ; possibly some Nausherani family remained at Samana in possession of a tract which was then conquered, and that the present Mandals are descended from him.

The Family of the Nawabs of Karnal 

The most prominent Mahal family was that of the Nawabs of Karnal. They first appear in history in 1780 A,D, when the family was residing at Samana, Nawab Majid-ul-daula granted to Nawab Sher-ul-din Khan, their ancestor, the parganas of Muzaffarnagar, Shoran and Chitrawal in the Muzaffarnagar District on condition that he furnished for Government service 200 horsemen fully equipped ; on the death of the grantee in 1789 the grant was continued on the same terms to his brother 
Mahomdi Khan by Daulat Rao Scindia.

In 1806 this Mahomdi Khan, his nephew Mahomed Ishaq and his cousin Ghairat AH Khan were in possession of these estates, and, in accordance with the policy of Lord Cornwalis, they were induced to accept a tract west of the Jumna in exchange. Thus the Mandals came to settle in Karnal.

One view of the possible origin of this tribe comes from Cecil Henry Buck who writes:

         It is very doubtful whether Mr. Ibbetson's idea of the Mandal descent is correct ; he has given no reasons, for his assertion and, beyond the fact that the Mandals follow some of the Jat customs, there appears to be no ground for believing them to belong to that tribe. On their seals the ancestors of the present Mandals called themselves " Mandal-i-Nausherani," i.e., the "Mandal" of the "Nausheranis," and we have to decide the meaning of this term. Nausherwan was a Persian King and Nausherwani chiefs have held sway at Kharan in Baluchistan since the 17th century. It appears from inquiries made there and from the Baluchistan Gazetteer that certain Nausheranis proceeded with Abdulla Khan of Kalat, when he accompanied Nadir Shah for the invasion of Delhi in 1738 A.D. ; it is probable that a member of the Nausherani family remained at Samana in possession of a tract which was then conquered, and that the present Mandals are descended from him. The meaning of the term "Mandal" as applied to this family is not certain ; in Shakespeare's dictionary the word, spelt with a hard "d," is translated as " a circle, halo ; a region, country ; a round tent ; an officer employed in villages, exciseman," while that spelt with a soft "d" is said to mean "a kind of wooden drum ; a fountain." Ibbetson refers to "Mandila" as meaning a platform on which guns are mounted. Of all these meanings the most probable is the exciseman or village officer, and it seems likely that an ancestor of the family was a Nausherani who was left in charge of Samana or some other place during the raid of Nadir Shah in order to collect taxes there, that he was therefore called "Mandal-i-Nausherani," and that he and his successors managed to stay in power there.

         It is not at all uncommon for adventurers and those who conquer and settle in foreign lands to adopt some of the customs of the people among whom they have come, and this would account for the Mandals following certain of the Jat customs.

         The fact that the affix " Khan " has been used by the family since they were first heard of in this neighbourhood, and that the first known member bore the title of " Nawab," tends to support the theory that they formerly belonged to the Nausherani family of Baluchistan.

Nawab Ahmad AH Khan, gave assisted the British authorities during the mutiny and for his services the quit-rent of Rs. 5,000 payable by him was remitted in perpetuity ; he was also presented with a khillat of Rs. 10,000 in Darbar and permitted to retain two cannon and one hundred 
armed retainers ; these honours have been continued to his suc- 
cessors. He died in 1867 and was succeeded by Azmat AH Khan, his eldest surviving son, who was given the title of " Nawab Bahadur." Azmat AH Khan died childless in 1909, and his half brother Muhammad Rustam AH Khan succeeded to the title of Nawab and the jagir, while he and his brother Muhammad Umar 
Daraz AH Khan inherited his estate. Before his death Azmat AH Khan, who was on bad terms with his half brothers, attempted to alienate his property, but it was brought under the Court of Wards and there is now litigation by the would-be donees to obtain possession thereof.

For good services Rustam Ali Khan received the personal title of " Nawab Bahadur " and Umar Daraz AH Khan that of Khan Bahadur. The latter was also an Honorary Sub-Registrar, Munsif and Magistrate of the 1st class.

Liaquat Ali Khan, the first Prime Minister of Pakistan, was the younger son of Rustam Ali Khan. The fact that the Samana branch spoke Punjabi, has historically created debates over the ethnic identity of Liaquat. Both the Karnal and Muzaffarnagar branches of the tribe spoke Urdu, as did other Mulla Jats.

Present situation
Presently, both the Samana and Karnal branches of the tribe emigrated to Pakistan, many are now found in the city of Punjab and Sindh. But many of the Jarauda Marhal are still found in India.

See also
 Ranghar

External links

Full text of the Annals of Karnal https://archive.org/stream/annalsofkarnal00buckrich/annalsofkarnal00buckrich_djvu.txt

References

Jat clans
Jat clans of Pakistan
Punjabi tribes
Muslim communities of India
Jat clans of Uttar Pradesh
Jat clans of Haryana
Muslim communities of Uttar Pradesh